Słomkowo may refer to the following places:
Słomkowo, Greater Poland Voivodeship (west-central Poland)
Słomkowo, Kuyavian-Pomeranian Voivodeship (north-central Poland)
Słomkowo, Masovian Voivodeship (east-central Poland)